The Pinkerton's Landing Bridge (officially known as the Pittsburgh & Lake Erie Railroad Bridge at Munhall) is a truss bridge that carries CSX Transportation's Pittsburgh Subdivision across the Monongahela River between Munhall, Pennsylvania and Rankin, Pennsylvania, United States. The structure's nickname references the 1892 Homestead strike. 
 

It is also known as the Pemickey Bridge, for the Pittsburgh, McKeesport and Youghiogheny Railroad (P. McK. & Y., pronounced "Pemickey") which used to run over the bridge.

See also
Homestead Strike
List of crossings of the Monongahela River

References

Railroad bridges in Pennsylvania
Bridges over the Monongahela River
CSX Transportation bridges
Pittsburgh and Lake Erie Railroad
Bridges in Allegheny County, Pennsylvania
Rivers of Steel National Heritage Area
Truss bridges in the United States
Steel bridges in the United States
Bridges completed in 1883
1883 establishments in Pennsylvania